Allouagne is a commune in the Pas-de-Calais department in the Hauts-de-France region of France.

Geography
The town is bypassed by the A26 autoroute to the north.

Population

Sights
 Two manorhouses, dating from the 16th and 17th century.
 The church of Saint-Leger, dating from the twentieth century.

International relations

Allouagne is twinned with:
  Ergste, a district of Schwerte in Germany

See also
Communes of the Pas-de-Calais department

References

Communes of Pas-de-Calais